Kampung Pimping is a Malay Brunei ethnic's village located in Membakut sub-District of Beaufort District in Sabah, Malaysia.

Beaufort District
Villages in Sabah